Jan Sønksen (born 10 April 1973) is a retired Danish football defender.

References

1973 births
Living people
Danish men's footballers
Footballers from Odense
Odense Boldklub players
Ikast FS players
Silkeborg IF players
Vejle Boldklub players
Danish Superliga players
Association football defenders